The 2019 Portugal Open was the first event of the 2019 ITTF Challenge Series. It took place from 15–17 February in Lisbon, Portugal.

Men's singles

Seeds

Draw

Top half

Section 1

Section 2

Bottom half

Section 3

Section 4

Finals

Women's singles

Seeds

Draw

Top half

Section 1

Section 2

Bottom half

Section 3

Section 4

Finals

Men's doubles

Seeds

Draw

Women's doubles

Seeds

Draw

Mixed doubles

Seeds

Draw

References

External links
 Tournament page on ITTF website

Portugal Open
Table tennis competitions in Portugal
International sports competitions hosted by Portugal
Portugal Open (table tennis)
Portugal Open